The Ložnica is a river in Slovenia, a left tributary of the Savinja in Celje.

References

Rivers of Styria (Slovenia)
Rivers of Celje